The Permanent Representative of Barbados to the United Nations is in charge of the Barbados's diplomatic mission to the United Nations Headquarters in New York City, United States of America. The current office holder is Keith Hamilton Lewellyn Marshall.  Apart from the Barbados mission to the UN in New York, there is another Barbadian mission based at the UNO office in Geneva, Switzerland, and Nairobi, Kenya.

See also 
United Nations Security Council Resolution 230
List of current Permanent Representatives to the United Nations
List of ambassadors and high commissioners to and from Barbados
Diplomatic missions of Barbados

References

External links 

United Nations
 
Barbados